Determine Girls Football Club is a Liberian professional women's football club based in Monrovia, founded in 2005. The club is in the Liberian Women's First Division, the top tier of women's football in Liberia. Due to its quality players and exciting style of play, it is regarded as the best female football club in the country.

Players

Current squad

Honours
By winning the 2022 CAF Women's Champions League WAFU Zone A Qualifiers, Determine Girls became the first Liberian female club, and the second (after AS Mende of Mali) within the region, to have won such tournament.

National 
 Liberian Women's First Division
 Winners (2): 2020–2021, 2021–2022

 Petro Trade Cup
 Winners (1): 2021–2022

 LFA Super Cup
 Winners (2): 2021, 2022

International 
CAF Women's Champions League WAFU Zone A Qualifiers
 Winners (1): 2022
 CAF Women's Champions League: 
Group stage(1): 2022

Technical staff 

Robertson Warner – head coach
Patience Gweh – deputy coach
Chally Johnson – team manager
Emmanuel Z- Play Bearkie – physical trainer
Edith Kerwillain and Mercy P.K. Dennis – medics
Prince Wuo – equipment manager

References

External links 
 

Football clubs in Africa
Football clubs in Liberia
Women's sport in Liberia